Lynn Johnson (born 1953) is an American photographer known for her contributions to National Geographic, Sports Illustrated and Life among others. Johnson is known for photographing vanishing languages and challenges to the human condition, with a focus on Africa and Asia.

Biography
Johnson received her bachelor's degree in photojournalism in 1975 from the Rochester Institute of Technology. Upon graduating she became the first woman staff photographer at the Pittsburgh Press, until departing in 1982 to pursue freelance work with Black Star Publishing Company and the Aurora photo agency. In 1984 the University of Pittsburgh Press published her book Pittsburgh Moments. She photographed Fred Rogers several times between 1980 and the early 2000s, and her photographs of Rogers were featured in the 2018 documentary Won't You Be My Neighbor? Johnson's photos of and working relationship with Rogers appeared in an NPR photo story titled "The Man Behind Mister Rogers, Away From The Neighborhood Of Make-Believe."

After working for nearly 30 years as a photojournalist, Johnson attended Ohio University's School of Visual Communications in the Scripps College of Communication as a master's student and recipient of the school's Knight Fellowship, graduating in 2004. In 2011 she donated her collection of analogue film photography to the Mahn Center for Archives and Special Collections at Ohio University Libraries.

Johnson is a recipient of Golden Quill awards in photojournalism and World Press Photo Awards in 1985, 1988 and 1992. In 2013 she was selected by her peers to win the National Geographic Photographer's Photographer award. In 2019 she was awarded the National Geographic's Eliza Scidmore Award for Outstanding Science Media, highlighting scientifically rigorous storytelling related to environmental and conservation issues.

Since 2013, Johnson has been a visiting professional at Syracuse University in the multimedia photography and design department (MPD).

Notable works 
Winner, Robert F. Kennedy Journalism Award for Coverage of the Disadvantaged, 1985

Finalist, Pulitzer for Explanatory Reporting to National Geographic Magazine's Gender Revolution issue, 2017

Her work has appeared in the following books:

 Women of Vision: National Geographic’s Female Photographers, 2013
 Through the Lens: National Geographic Greatest Photographs, 2003
 Edward Curtis: Coming to Light, 2002
 John Muir: Nature’s Visionary, 2001
 Nature’s Medicines: Plants that Heal, 2000
 Women Photographers at National Geographic, 2000
 Women in the Material World, 1996
 Power to Heal, 1990
 Men’s Lives, 1984

References

External links

Lynn Johnson on Photo Society
Lynn Johnson Collection at Ohio University Libraries

1953 births
Living people
American photographers
National Geographic photographers
Rochester Institute of Technology alumni
21st-century American women
Ohio University alumni
Women photojournalists
American photojournalists
20th-century American women photographers
20th-century American photographers
21st-century American women photographers
21st-century American photographers